Orange Scott (February 13, 1800 – July 31, 1847) was an American Methodist Episcopal minister, Presiding Elder, and District President. He presided over the convention that organized the Wesleyan Methodist Connexion in 1843, and was among the founders of what became known as the Wesleyan Methodist Church, having separated from the Methodist Episcopal Church. He was born in Brookfield, Vermont, the eldest of eight children. The family was poor and Orange was working full-time when he was twelve.

"Orange Scott became convinced that the holy hearts should result in holy lives and that holy men should seek to bring an end to social evils such as slavery and intemperance."

Ministry

In 1843, Rev. Scott organized what he called "a new anti-slavery, anti-intemperance, anti-every-thing wrong, church organization" named the Wesleyan Methodist Connexion.

Despite public opinion, Rev. Scott insisted: "...though public opinion commanded Mr. Wesley to desist through the medium of mobs, still he stood it out! Shame on his compromising sons! The Methodists in all parts of the United States have braved, and, finally, to a considerable extent, changed public opinion. Every man's hand has been against us, and yet we have stood firm.But now comes up the new doctrine of compromise! Let it be banished from the breast of every patriot, philanthropist, and Christian.The advocates of temperance have braved and changed public opinion. The same may be said of Wilberforce, and the English abolitionists. And with all these examples before us, shall we succumb to an unholy public opinion, founded in the love of gain! Shall we turn our backs upon the cause of suffering humanity, because public opinion frowns upon us? No! Never!!"

Rev. Scott: "I assumed the position that the principle of slavery—-the principle which justifies holding and treating the human species as property, is morally wrong—-or, in other words, that it is a sin. The principle, I contended, aside from all circumstances, is evil, ONLY EVIL, and that CONTINUALLY! I said, no hand could sanctify it—-no circumstances could change it from bad to good. It was a reprobate—-too bad to be converted—-not subject to the law of God, neither indeed could be. I admitted that circumstances might palliate, and circumstances might aggravate, but no circumstances could justify the principle."
"He who has made of one blood, all nations of men to dwell on the earth' [Acts 17:26] must look with disapprobation upon such a system of complicated wrongs, as American slavery... abolition is from above (of which I have no more doubt than of the truth of Christianity)..."

References

External links 
 
 The Life of Rev. Orange Scott: Compiled from His Personal Narrative
 

1800 births
Wesleyan Methodists
American Methodist clergy
Converts to Methodism
1847 deaths
19th-century American clergy